Koeleria pyramidata is a Eurasian plant species in the grass family. It is found in grasslands from France + Denmark to Nepal + Siberia.

References

Pooideae
Flora of Europe
Flora of Asia
Plants described in 1791
Taxa named by Jean-Baptiste Lamarck
Taxa named by Palisot de Beauvois